That Ras is a football club based in Al Karak which competes in the Jordan League.

Stadium
That Ras plays their home games at Prince Faisal Stadium in Al-Karak. The stadium holds 7,000 people.

Kits
That Ras's home kit is all blue shirts and shorts, while their away kit is all white shirts and shorts.

Kit suppliers and shirt sponsors

Honors
Jordan FA Cup: 1
 2013.

Performance in AFC competitions
AFC Cup: 1 appearances

2014: Round 16

Current squad

Notable/Former Players
 Adel El Adham
 Moataz Abdulhasib
 Mohamed Talaat
 Yousuf Ahmed
 Baha' Abdel-Rahman
 Moataz Yaseen
 Sharif Al-Nawaisheh
 Abdulkader Mjarmesh
 Adnan Kareet
 Fahd Youssef
 Jwan Hesso
 Moataz Salhani
 Mohamed Bash Buyuk
 Ra'ef Halima
 Samer Salem
 Tawfiq Tayarah
 Wasim Bourashi
 Amine Krichene
 Merounne Ghoul
 Wael Bellakhal

Managerial History
 Taha Abdul-Jalil
 Abdel-Rahman Idris
 Assaf Khalifa
 Emad Khankan
 Nizar Mahrous
 Maher Sdiri
 Adel Al-Atrash
 Ahmed Abdel-Qader
 Diane Saleh

External links

Football clubs in Jordan
1980 establishments in Jordan
Association football clubs established in 1980